Sir Ralph Sadler or Sadleir PC, Knight banneret (1507 – 30 March 1587) was an English statesman, who served Henry VIII as Privy Councillor, Secretary of State and ambassador to Scotland. Sadler went on to serve Edward VI. Having signed the device settling the crown on Jane Grey in 1553, he was obliged to retire to his estates during the reign of Mary I. Sadler was restored to royal favour during the reign of Elizabeth I, serving as a Privy Councillor and once again participating in Anglo-Scottish diplomacy. He was appointed Chancellor of the Duchy of Lancaster in May 1568.

Family and early life
Ralph Sadler was born in Hackney, Middlesex, the elder son of Henry Sadler, a minor official in the service of the Marquess of Dorset and Sir Edward Belknap. Henry Sadler was originally from Warwickshire, but later settled in  Hackney. Ralph had a brother, John, who commanded a company at the Siege of Boulogne in 1544.

At around seven years of age, Sadler was placed in the household of Thomas Cromwell, later Earl of Essex, where he received an excellent education. He was taught to read and write, becoming fluent in French, Latin and Greek and acquired a working knowledge of the law. He proved to be not only intelligent and resourceful but also capable of great feats of horsemanship and was skilled at falconry.

Roger Ascham compared Sadler's appearance in terms of complexion, countenance and beard to Duke Maurice, although the Duke was taller. Sadler is also represented by his tomb effigy at Standon, and he may have been painted by Hans Holbein the Younger.

Courtier and diplomat 
Sadler began his career as secretary to Thomas Cromwell and went on to serve four Tudor monarchs. During his long career in royal service, he held many offices, including:
 Clerk of the Hanaper 1535–1587
 Gentleman of the Privy Chamber by May 1536
 Ambassador to Scotland 1537, 1540, 1542
 Jointly (with John Godsalve, Gregory Railton and Francis Kempe) prothonotary, Chancery 1537 – 1587?
 Principal Secretary April 1540 – April 1543
 Privy Councillor 1540–1553, 1566–1587
 Master of the Great Wardrobe 1543–1553
 Justice of the Peace Hertfordshire 1544–1547, 1558/59 – 1561, Gloucestershire 1547, Hertfordshire 1562–1587
 Chamberlain or receiver, Court of General Surveyors by 1545
 Commissioner for Musters, Hertfordshire 1546, loan 1546, 1562, goods of churches and fraternities 1550, relief, Hertfordshire and London 1550, ecclesiastical causes 1572
 Steward of Hertford and Constable of Hertford Castle December 1549 – 1554, 1559–1587
 Warden of the East and Middle Marches 1559–1560
 Custos rotulorum Hertfordshire. by 1562 – 1587
 Chancellor of the Duchy of Lancaster 1568–1587
 Lord Lieutenant, Hertfordshire 1569

In the service of Cromwell and the King, 1526 to 1539
By the time he was 19 Sadler was serving as Thomas Cromwell's secretary, learning about administration, finance and politics. In this role, he handled Cromwell's household business and was also involved in drafting and writing his correspondence. By 1529 he had become one of Cromwell's most trusted friends and was appointed an executor of his will. Between 1525 and 1529, his name appeared in Cromwell's correspondence in connection with the suppression of monasteries. It was probably around this time that his talents came to the attention of the king. He was granted the manor and lands from the suppressed St Leonard's Priory in Bow.

It was probably soon after Cromwell's elevation to the peerage, on 9 July 1536, that Sadler was named a gentleman of the Privy Chamber. In the same year, he became M.P. for Hindon, Wiltshire and his name also appears in the list of administrators named for Catherine of Aragon's will.

In January 1537, Sadler was sent to Scotland to investigate complaints made by Margaret Tudor, the King's sister, against her third husband, Henry Stewart, 1st Lord Methven, and to improve Anglo-Scottish relations. He succeeded in both respects. On 1 April 1537, Ralph met James V of Scotland, newly married to Madeleine of Valois, at Rouen.

The King was pleased with Sadler's work and sent him again to Scotland, this time to discourage the King of Scotland, James V, from accepting Cardinal Beaton's proposed Franco-Scottish alliance. Sadler failed in that respect, but the King was nonetheless impressed with his work. In 1539 he was elected knight of the shire (MP) for Middlesex.

Mr. Secretary: Henry VIII and Edward VI, 1540 to 1557 
In April 1540 Sadler was made principal secretary to the king, a position he held jointly with Thomas Wriothesley. In the same year, he was knighted, made a privy councillor, and began more than 30 years of service representing Hertfordshire in Parliament. He represented Preston in 1545.

Sadler survived the fall from power and subsequent execution of his friend and mentor in 1540; however, during the power struggle following Cromwell's demise, he was arrested and sent to the Tower.  On the evening of 17 January 1541, the Imperial ambassador, Eustace Chapuys, and the French ambassador, Charles de Marillac, reported to their masters that Sir Ralph Sadler and Sir Thomas Wyatt had been arrested, as had another courtier Sir John Wallop.  The following morning they were taken from Hampton Court, with their hands bound, accompanied by 24 archers, to the Tower. Marillac noted that it "must be some great matter" for Wyatt "has for enemies all who leagued against Cromwell, whose minion he was."

Sadler was able to clear himself and was released in a few days, returning to the council chamber. He played a leading role in the examination of Catherine Howard and her relatives in November 1541, regained the King's trust, and was knighted for his part in holding matters of state while the court went on a summer progress of the North in a tripartite ministry with Lords Audley and Hertford.  Together with his allies in the council, notably Thomas Cranmer, Sadler gathered evidence in an unsuccessful attempt to discredit Norfolk and Gardiner, the men who had orchestrated Thomas Cromwell's downfall.

From courtier to career diplomat: Mission to Scotland 

Sadler was sent to Scotland several times. In 1540 he tried to embarrass and undermine the authority of Cardinal Beaton, an ally of France, with letters captured from his messenger Alexander Crichton of Brunstane whose ship had been forced by a storm to put into England. However, James V of Scotland refused to accept that the letters were compromising, and argued in favour of the Cardinal that he had a separate spiritual authority in Scotland apart from the King's own temporal powers. Later, when the Cardinal was present, James and Sadler compared the captured letters with Beaton's copies and found a discrepancy. James V said he was thankful to Sadler and his uncle Henry VIII but still would not find fault in the Cardinal's actions.

Following the Battle of Solway Moss, Sadler was sent to Scotland again, in March 1543, to arrange a marriage between the infant Mary, Queen of Scots, and Edward, Prince of Wales. He was a successful negotiator for the Treaty of Greenwich, although the marriage was not concluded. On 22 March 1543, he rode from Edinburgh to Linlithgow Palace to see the queen for the first time. Mary of Guise asked the nurse Jean Sinclair to show him the queen out of her swaddling clothes. The scene was depicted by a 19th-century artist Benjamin Haydon. Sadler wrote that the infant was "as goodly a child I have seen, and like to live". Mary reminded him that in turn Regent Arran wanted his son James Hamilton to marry Princess Elizabeth. Mary tried to work on him to intercede for Regent Arran to release Cardinal Beaton from imprisonment, alleging the Cardinal's political expertise could be employed to mutual benefit. Henry VIII wanted English servants in Mary's household, and Sadler recommended "Lady Edongcomb" for this role, his friend, Katherine Edgcumbe the widow of Peter Edgecumbe of Cotehele.

On 10 August 1543 Sadler wrote to Henry VIII describing another visit to Mary of Guise and the infant Queen, this time at Stirling Castle;"(Mary of Guise) is very glad that she is at Stirling, and much she praised there about the house, and told me, "That her daughter did grow apace; and soon," she said, "she would be a woman, if she took of her mother;" who indeed, is of the largest stature of women. And therefore she caused also the child to be brought to me, to the intent I might see her, assuring your majesty, that she is a right fair and goodly child, as any that I have seen for her age."

By November Sadler, fearing for his safety as the mood in Edinburgh turned against England, moved to Tantallon Castle, which belonged to the Earl of Angus. Regent Arran sent the Rothesay Herald to Tantallon, ordering him to return Sadler to England, having "seen daily his great practices made to seduce and corrupt true faithful subjects of this realm to the opinion of England." The Earl's kinsmen conveyed him to Berwick upon Tweed on 11 December 1543. All of his work in solidifying Anglo-Scottish relations came to nothing, and war followed after the Scottish rejection of Treaty of Greenwich in December 1543.

Sadler was replaced by William Paget as Secretary of State in April 1543, owing to his frequent absences on diplomatic missions, but was appointed Master of the Great Wardrobe. He was treasurer for the war against Scotland with the Earl of Hertford during his punitive expedition to Edinburgh in May 1544. Sadler accompanied Hertford into Scotland, in the same role in September 1545.  He accompanied Lord Hertford again, this time at the Battle of Pinkie in the post of High Treasurer of the Army.  On 10 September 1547, in recognition of his services during the fighting, Sadler was made a knight banneret.

Sadler was present when Stephen Gardiner, Bishop of Winchester, was arrested, and he also accompanied the force that put down Robert Kett's Norfolk Rebellion. When Henry VIII was preparing his will on Boxing Day 1546, he had already appointed Sadler onto the Council of Regency that was to rule England during Edward VI's minority and left him £200 in his will.

In 1550 Sadler sold his mansion at Hackney. He was one of the signatories of Edward VI's will in 1553, proving one of the radicals in a Protestant government. He signed the device settling the crown on the Protestant Jane Grey, and was noted by Lord Burghley as one of those expected to act on her behalf.

Mary I and Elizabeth I, 1558 to 1587

On the accession of the Catholic Mary I to the throne, after the resolution of the succession crisis, Sadler lost most of his offices, including master of the great wardrobe, he was removed from the commissions of the peace and excluded from the Privy Council. He was briefly under house arrest from 25 to 30 July 1553 before being granted a pardon on 6 October. For the rest of Mary I's reign he did not sit in any parliament, remaining in semi-retirement at Standon, Hertfordshire.

During the reign of Elizabeth I, restored to royal favour, Sadler was sent to Scotland on 8 August 1559 to arrange an alliance with the Scottish Protestants, and forward the cause of the Lords of the Congregation and Duke of Chatelherault. After the English became directly involved in the fighting at the Battle of Leith, he was one of the architects of the Treaty of Edinburgh.

In 1568 he was appointed Chancellor of the Duchy of Lancaster, and when Mary, Queen of Scots, fled to England, Sadler was unwillingly appointed to meet with the Scottish commissioners regarding that problem. He was sent to arrest the Duke of Norfolk in Scotland in 1572 following the Rising of the Northern Earls. He was reluctantly appointed jailer of Mary, Queen of Scots. From summer 1584 to spring 1585, Mary was housed at Wingfield Manor and Tutbury Castle, under Sadler's charge. During that time, Elizabeth was nervous about Mary's plans against her. According to Andrea Clarke there was "a tangible, palpable sense of heightened levels of fear among Elizabeth's government and ministers about her safety in the midst of the danger posed by Mary Queen of Scots, who for many Catholics was a figurehead". Sadler was instructed to restrict Mary's freedom. Francis Walsingham chided Sadler for taking Mary "hawkyng" and for giving her "more lybertye now then at any tyme when she was in the E of Shrewsbury chardge". Sadler was required to post guards round the castle and to search the grounds "once or twice a moneth". After the Babington Plot, Sadler was on the council that sentenced Mary to death.

Marriage and issue
Around 1534, Ralph Sadler married Ellen, daughter of John Mitchell, of Much Hadham, Hertfordshire, who at the time of their marriage was believed to be the widow of Matthew Barre (or Barrow) of Sevenoaks in Kent. The couple had three sons and four daughters:

 Sir Thomas Sadler of Standon, Hertfordshire, (c. 1536 – 1607), named after Thomas Cromwell, who succeeded him married twice:
 Ursula, daughter of Sir Henry Sherington of Lacock, Wiltshire
 Gertrude, daughter of Robert Markham, of Cotham, Nottinghamshire, by whom he had a son Ralph, and a daughter Gertrude, who married Walter Aston, 1st Lord Aston of Forfar. On Ralph's death in 1661, Standon passed to Gertrude's son, Walter.
 Edward Sadler of Temple Dinsley, (died 4 April 1584) married Anne, daughter and heir of Sir Richard Lee of Sopwell, Hertfordshire
 Henry Sadler of Everleigh, Wiltshire, (c. 1538 – 1618), married twice:
 Mary, daughter of Gilbert Everley
 Ursula, daughter of John Gill
 Anne Sadler (died 1576), married George Horsey of Digswell, Hertfordshire
 Mary Sadler married Thomas Bolle of Wallington, Hertfordshire
 Jane Sadler (died c. 1587), married Edward Baeshe of Stansted Bury, Hertfordshire.
 Dorothy Sadler (died c. 1578), married Edward Elrington of Byrchall, Essex

Sadler may have had an illegitimate son, Richard.

The return of Matthew Barre

More than eleven years after Ralph and Ellen had married, Matthew Barre returned alive and well from Ireland and was overheard in a London tavern claiming to be the lawful husband of Sadler's wife. Ralph and his wife had seven surviving children, and he was now a very wealthy and influential person at court whose reputation was at stake. Sadler, a man devoted to his wife and children, was informed of the matter in October 1545 while on a diplomatic mission in Scotland. "Master Sadler took his matter very heavily," the Lord Chancellor, Wriothesley reported to Secretary Paget.

Ellen Mitchell and Matthew Barre had been legally married in 1526, in Dunmow in Essex. They had two daughters before Barre abandoned them and went to Ireland. Ellen stayed in Dunmow for about a year trying to find out where he had gone. She then became a servant of the prioress at the nunnery of Clerkenwell. Determined to find Matthew, she visited his birthplace and with his brothers made further enquiries, but without success. Despairing of an answer she returned to Clerkenwell. Not long afterwards a man belonging to the city of Salisbury positively assured her that her husband was dead. Recommended by the Prioress of Clerkenwell, Ellen entered the service of Thomas Cromwell's mother-in-law, Mercy Pryor, and was dwelling in his house when Ralph Sadler became enamoured of her. Ralph Sadler and Ellen married believing that Matthew Barre was dead.

A version of Ellen's story was given by an Elizabethan writer, Nicolas Sander, and attempted to cast doubt on her character, without success. Sander claimed that Ellen (née Mitchell) was related to Thomas Cromwell, and that she had worked for him in his household. Given that Cromwell was known to take pity on widows, this is not unlikely.  The 17th-century historian Gilbert Burnet considered that Sander's story was a fiction. Sander was a Jesuit, a Catholic recusant writing with an agenda. He took delight in attempting to discredit leading public figures in England. There was no scandal surrounding the marriage between Ellen and Ralph when it took place. Cromwell's paternal aunt was Margaret Mitchell, and Ellen may have been a relative of Margaret and her husband William, or William's brother Thomas, all of whom once lived with and worked for Walter Cromwell. Rather than slandering Ellen and Ralph, this shows a friendly familial beginning. 

An investigation found that Ellen's first marriage was valid, and Sadler was therefore obliged to have his children legitimised by a private Act of Parliament. In 1546, this Act of Parliament 37 Hen. VIII, c.30 was passed on his behalf. The Act set aside Ellen's marriage to Matthew Barre and made her marriage to Ralph Sadler a true and proper union. Sadler managed to prevent the publication of the Act and its details never appeared among the statutes of the period. The only known contemporary reference to the Act appears in a transcript entitled The Unprecedented Case of Sir Ralph Sadleir in the Library of the Inner Temple. Matthew Barre disappeared from the scene.

This episode damaged Sadler's reputation, but not irretrievably. His marriage to Ellen was saved and the couple lived on, without further incident, for many years.

Death 
Sadler's wife was still living in 1569; however, there is no further record of her and there is no surviving tomb for her. Sir Ralph died 30 March 1587, reputedly, "the richest commoner in England". His tomb lies beneath a magnificent wall monument in St. Mary's Church, Standon, Hertfordshire. He left the majority of his vast landholdings, including Standon and Buntingford, Hertfordshire, to his eldest son and heir, Thomas Sadler. Henry Sadler received the manors of Hungerford, Berkshire, and Everley, Wiltshire, Jane Bash received a diamond ring and an annuity was provided for Richard Sadler.

Works

Sadler is one of the few Renaissance statesmen for whom extant Parliamentary orations survive, including a speech on succession in 1563 and one on subsidy in 1566. Copies of the orations appear in the 1809 two-volume publication of his letters, which includes a biography by Walter Scott.

Fictional portrayals

Sadler is one of the major characters in Hilary Mantel's 2009 novel Wolf Hall, which gives a fictional portrayal of Sadler's youth and early manhood in the household of Thomas Cromwell. During the BBC 2 series, he is portrayed by Thomas Brodie-Sangster. Sadler also appears prominently in Bring Up the Bodies and The Mirror & the Light, Mantel's sequels to Wolf Hall. He is also a minor character in Philippa Gregory's book The Other Queen, with an account given of the time he spent as the Queen of Scots' gaoler.

Ralph Sadler plays a large role in the Queenmaker Series by author Caroline Angus, based on Thomas Cromwell's life between 1529 and 1540, with Ralph Sadler rising at the royal court and as a Scottish ambassador for Henry VIII.

See also 
 Secretary of State (England)
 Privy Councillor

Footnotes

Sources

External links

 SADLER, Ralph (1507–87), of Hackney, Mdx., Standon, Herts. and Lesnes, Kent. A biography
 Portrait of a Man (Sir Ralph Sadler?) A possible portrait
 
 Colin Salter, Sir Ralph Sadleir (1507–1587) and the Gossips
 Gerry Cordon, Sutton House: Home of Ralph Sadler, Late of 'Wolf Hall' 
 

Secretaries of State of the Kingdom of England
Chancellors of the Duchy of Lancaster
Ambassadors of England to Scotland
Court of James V of Scotland
English people of the Rough Wooing
Scottish Reformation
Members of the Parliament of England for Hertfordshire
People from Hackney Central
1507 births
1587 deaths
Gentlemen of the Privy Chamber
English MPs 1536
English MPs 1539–1540
English MPs 1542–1544
English MPs 1545–1547
English MPs 1553 (Edward VI)
English MPs 1559
English MPs 1563–1567
English MPs 1571
English MPs 1572–1583
English MPs 1584–1585
English MPs 1586–1587
16th-century English diplomats
Knights banneret of England
People from East Hertfordshire District
People of Linlithgow Palace
Ralph